Felicitas is a 2009 Argentine romantic drama film directed by María Teresa Costantini.

Cast
 Sabrina Garciarena as Felicitas
 Gonzalo Heredia as Enrique Ocampo
 Alejandro Awada as Carlos Guerrero
 Ana Celentano as Felisa Guerrero
 Nicolas Mateo as Cristian De Maria
 Antonella Costa as Manuela
 Luis Brandoni as Martín de Alzaga
 Carlos Rivkin as George

External links
 

2009 films
Argentine drama films
2000s Spanish-language films
2009 drama films
Films scored by Nico Muhly
2000s Argentine films